Bell's Fork is an unincorporated community in Pitt County, North Carolina, United States. Bell's Fork is located on North Carolina Highway 43 at the southeastern border of Greenville.

Red Banks Primitive Baptist Church, which is listed on the National Register of Historic Places, is located in Bell's Fork.

References

Unincorporated communities in Pitt County, North Carolina
Unincorporated communities in North Carolina